David Hyon Moon (born January 28, 1979) is an American activist, lawyer, and politician. He is currently a member of the Maryland House of Delegates representing District 20 in Montgomery County, Maryland.

Early life and education 

Moon was born in Takoma Park, Maryland to Korean immigrants. He graduated from Walt Whitman High School, after which he double majored in sociology and philosophy at Tufts University. In 2004, he received a J.D. from the Washington College of Law of American University.

Career

Moon worked as a program director for the progressive, civil liberties group Demand Progress. In 2014, he edited Maryland Juice a state politics blog, while working as a policy attorney and Democratic political consultant. Previously, he served as the Chief Operating Officer of the election reform group, FairVote, coordinating advocacy efforts to improve the electoral process.

Political activity

Moon served as Campaign Director for Jamie Raskin's 2006 election to the Maryland State Senate, defeating five term incumbent Ida Ruben.  Later, Moon worked on the County Council campaign for Nancy Navarro in 2008.
 
In 2013, he announced his candidacy for Maryland State Assembly, replacing the seat vacated by Heather Mizeur who ran for governor. As an Asian American, he was inspired by Obama's 2008 victory. In 2016, he was a candidate for the seat vacated by Jamie Raskin's election to Congress, earning endorsements from Service Employees International Union, CASA de Maryland, and Progressive Maryland.

Positions

In the legislature, Moon is a member of the House Judiciary Committee and is the Chair of the Criminal Law & Procedure Subcommittee. He was the prior Chair of the Juvenile Law Subcommittee from 2017-2019 and continues to hold membership in the Maryland Legislative Asian-American and Pacific-Islander Caucus.

Moon has been a vocal advocate to decriminalize drug laws that have led to mass incarceration. Strongly supportive of greater transparency and accountability, Moon co-sponsored legislation to require video streaming of all Maryland House and Senate sessions and their committees.

In 2018, Moon was a leader behind regional efforts to prevent massive subsidies for a new stadium and require a name change for Washington's football team. Moon introduced legislation that would prevent Maryland from offering public funding to encourage owner Daniel Snyder to locate the team in Maryland. He was joined by David Grosso, his legislative colleague on the Council of the District of Columbia.

He sought to join other legislators to oppose the conservative agenda of Republican Governor Larry Hogan.

In 2020, Moon introduced legislation allowing the use of no-knock warrants by Maryland Police only as a last resort. The measure came in the wake of outrage over the shooting of Breonna Taylor.

Other activities

As a program director with the online organizing group Demand Progress, Moon was active organization helped lead the fight against the Stop Online Piracy Act and related bills. Moon was a co-editor of a book about that effort, called Hacking Politics.

References

1979 births
American politicians of Korean descent
Asian-American people in Maryland politics
Living people
Democratic Party members of the Maryland House of Delegates
People from Takoma Park, Maryland
Tufts University School of Arts and Sciences alumni
Washington College of Law alumni
21st-century American politicians
Walt Whitman High School (Maryland) alumni